Paha or Baha is a Kra language spoken in northern Guangnan County, Wenshan Prefecture, Yunnan. The two villages are located near the border with Longlin County, Guangxi. Paha is often considered to be part of the Buyang dialect cluster and is the most divergent form. Although listed in Ethnologue as Baha Buyang (ISO 639-3: yha), Thai linguist Weera Ostapirat considers Paha to be a separate language.

Demographics
Within Guangnan County (广南县), Yunnan, the Paha language is spoken in the two villages of Yangliancun (央连村) (from Zhuang  "lonely Buyang [village]") in Dixu Township (底圩乡) and Anshecun (安舍村) in Bada Township 八达乡. While Yanglian has around 500 Paha speakers, Anshe only has about 100 speakers left. Paha speakers are shifting rapidly to Zhuang and Southwestern Mandarin, particularly in Anshe village. Many Buyang men in Yanglian village are also married to Zhuang women.

Phonology

Consonants
Paha Buyang has the following consonants.

Vowels
Paha Buyang has the following vowels.

The three high vowels and the low vowel can be long.

Grammar
Unlike the Buyang dialects of Langjia, Ecun, and Yalang, Paha negatives (such as ) precede the verb, whereas the Buyang dialects always place negatives at the end of a sentence. This phenomenon in Paha is probably due to Chinese influence.

References

External links
 ABVD: Paha word list

Kra languages
Languages of Yunnan